"Gangsta Lovin is the lead single from Eve's third studio album, Eve-Olution (2002). The song features R&B-soul singer Alicia Keys. Released in July 2002, "Gangsta Lovin became Eve's second consecutive number-two hit on the Billboard Hot 100 as well as her third consecutive top-10 hit in the United Kingdom.

When being asked in an interview why she chose Keys to be on the song, Eve said, "I love Alicia, I mean I think she's incredibly talented, and I needed a girl on the song, and why not Alicia Keys?". The chorus contains re-sung elements from Yarbrough and Peoples' 1981 song "Don't Stop the Music", which were also used on Common's 1997 song "All Night Long" featuring Erykah Badu.

Music video
The video for "Gangsta Lovin, directed by Little X, starts with girls putting food on their plates from a buffet table with shirts on that say "Eve", "&", "Alicia", "In", and "Gangsta Love". It then goes to a swimming pool where Eve and Keys are sitting in beach chairs. Eve is glancing at a man she is clearly interested in. The video then switches off showing the pool scene, a scene in a room where Eve is rapping by herself, and a room where Keys is singing by herself. For the second verse, Eve walks into a party where the man she is interested in is. The man catches Eve's eye, and they smile at each other. In the chorus, it shows them talking and exchanging phone numbers. At the beginning of the third verse, Keys and Eve are in the same room. The man is shown calling Eve, and Eve goes to the beach and sits down with him. Keys stands at the beach singing by herself. Eve and the man walk down the beach together. At the end, Eve and Keys are shown wearing "Gangsta Love" shirts.

Track listings

US CD and 12-inch single
 "Gangsta Lovin (featuring Alicia Keys)
 "Satisfaction" (snippet)
 "Party in the Rain (snippet featuring Mashonda)
 "Double R What" (snippet featuring Jadakiss and Styles)
 "Neckbones" (snippet)

Australasian CD single
 "Gangsta Lovin (featuring Alicia Keys) – 3:59
 "U Me & She" – 3:52
 "Let Me Blow Ya Mind" (Stargate remix featuring Gwen Stefani) – 3:33
 "Who's That Girl?" (instrumental) – 4:41

European CD single
 "Gangsta Lovin (featuring Alicia Keys) – 3:59
 "U Me & She" – 3:52

UK CD and cassette single
 "Gangsta Lovin (featuring Alicia Keys) – 4:01
 "Who's That Girl?" – 4:41
 "Gangsta Lovin (instrumental) – 4:00

UK 12-inch single
A1. "Gangsta Lovin (featuring Alicia Keys) – 4:01
A2. "Gangsta Lovin (instrumental) – 4:00
B1. "Who's That Girl?" – 4:41

Charts and certifications

Weekly charts

Year-end charts

Certifications

Release history

In popular culture
 The song's music video was parodied on the sketch comedy show MADtv. The parody was titled "Gangsta Lover", where Eve and Alicia Keys (both portrayed by former MADtv cast member Debra Wilson) talk about dating criminals.

References

External links
 Gangsta Lovin' at Discogs

2002 singles
2002 songs
Alicia Keys songs
Eve (rapper) songs
Interscope Records singles
Music videos directed by Director X
Ruff Ryders Entertainment singles
Songs written by Lonnie Simmons